Leopoldo Dante Tévez (born March 22, 1942), known as Leo Dan, is an Argentine composer and singer born in Villa Atamisqui, Santiago del Estero Province.  He recorded more than 20 albums during his long career during the late 20th century between Argentina and Mexico. His appreciation for Mexican music led him to record with mariachis, and from there he went to international fame.  His music was well received by the Mexican public since his voice was a good match to the traditional mariachi sound.

His greatest hits include "Celia", "Fanny", "Como te extraño, mi amor", "Estelita", "Libre solitario y sin nadie", "Santiago querido", "Qué tiene la niña", "Por un caminito", "Solo una vez", "Mary es mi amor", "Siempre estoy pensando en ella", "Te he prometido", "Esa pared", "Toquen mariachis, canten", "El radio está tocando tu canción", "Pareces una nena", "Yo sé que no es feliz", "Más que un loco", "Fue una noche de verano", "Pídeme la luna" and "Ojos Azules".

Leo Dan currently lives in the United States. He, Palito Ortega and Leonardo Favio are considered the principal Argentine singers of the Nueva Ola (New Wave) music that was popular in the 1960s and 1970s in Latin America. With a mellow voice and his individual interpretative style, Leo Dan is one of the most recognized figures among Spanish-language vocalists. His inspiration went further than interpretation; he also wrote most of his popular hits.

In 2012, the Latin Recording Academy honored Leo Dan by presenting him with The Latin Recording Academy Lifetime Achievement Award

Tévez's hit "Te he prometido" features prominently in Alfonso Cuarón's 2018 multi-Oscar and Golden Globe-winning film Roma.

Partial discography
Full discography at his official website
 1963 – Leo Dan
 1964 – Como Te Extraño Mi Amor
 1964 – El Fenómeno
 1965 – Bajo El Signo De Leo
 1966 – Libre, Solterito y Sin Nadie
 1967 – Así Soy Yo
 1967 – La Novela Del Joven Pobre
 1968 – Quiero Que Me Beses Amor Mío
 1969 – Te He Prometido''''
 1969 – Y Que Viva Tu Amor 1970 – Con Los Brazos Cruzados 1970 – Mucho, Mucho 1971 – ¿Cómo Poder Saber Si Te Amo? 1971 – Triunfador De América 1972 – Quien No Tiene Una Ilusión 1973 – Para Qué 1973 – Siempre Estoy Pensando En Ella 1974 – Tu Llegaste Cuando Menos Lo Esperaba 1975 – Esa Pared 1976 – Amar, Sabiendo Perdonar 1976 – Tú 1977 – Pero Esa Vez, Lloré 1978 – XV Años De Oro 1979 – Ahora Con Mariachi 1979 – Tengo Que Buscar A Lola 1980 – Con Sabor Ranchero 1980 – Santiago Querido (Con Los Manseros Santiagueños) 1980 – Vallenato 1981 – Canta Folklore 1981 – Mi Vida La Paso Cantando 1981 – Niña Que Tienen Tus Ojos 1982 – El Radio Está Tocando Tu Canción 1982 – Tengan Cuidado 1983 – Con Sabor A México 1983 – Linda 1985 – La Fé De Un Elegido 1986 – Ojos Azules 1987 – 15 Auténticos Éxitos 1988 – Más Que Un Loco 1989 – Noche De Verano 1990 – Soy De Cualquier Lugar 1991 – Leo Rap 1992 – Como Un León 1993 – Antologia Musical 1994 – Después De Conocerte 1996 – Asi Es El Amor 1996 – Idolos De Siempre 1997 – Acompáñame 1999 – A Pesar De Los Años [Mate] (Disco Cristiano)
 1999 – Encuentro Santiagueño 1999 – Mis 30 Mejores Canciones (Nuevas Grabaciones) (2 CD)
 1999 – Todos Sus Grandes Exitos En España (1963–1976) 2001 – Amanecer desnudo 2002 – 20 De Colección 2002 – Exitos Con Mariachi 2002 – Personalidad (20 Exitos) 2005 – De Regreso 2004 – 20 Éxitos De Leo Dan (En Vivo) 2006 – 20 Éxitos Originales 2006 – Canciones De Amor 2006 – La Historia 2008 – Lo Esencial De Leo Dan (3 CD)
 2009 – Aires De Zamba 2013 – Leo, Escribo y Canto 2018 – Celebrando a una Leyenda Los discos de oroPara ti mis cancionesRomántico y ranchero (2 volúmenes)Leo Dan y Leonardo Favio, frente a frenteLatin starsEl disco del millónEl ídoloLos fabulosos 60'sLos mejoresDos en uno15 pistas para cantarAños dorados¿Cómo poder saber si te amo? (reedición)

Filmography
 Story of a Poor Young Man'' (1968)

References

External links
Official Page

Biografia

1945 births
Living people
People from Santiago del Estero Province
20th-century Argentine male singers
Argentine people of Diaguita descent
Argentine people of Quechua descent
Argentine expatriates in the United States
Latin Grammy Lifetime Achievement Award winners
Latin music songwriters